Chinnavedampatti a suburb of Coimbatore City in the state of Tamil Nadu, India. It is located on the North-east direction, which comes under the Coimbatore Corporation.

Geography
It has an average elevation of 338 metres (1108 feet). Chinnavedampatt is situated towards North East from Coimbatore City on the way to Annur between NH-67 and NH-209. This suburb shares borders with Saravanampatti, Vellakinar, Goundampalayam.

Climate
Chinnavedampatti is very closely located to other suburbs of Coimbatore.  This proximity provides this place a very pleasant climate.  Here the temperature is quite pleasant throughout the year. The temperature during both summers and winters varies anywhere between 34 °C to 22 °C. The best time to visit here is between the months of March to July and November to January.

Demographics
 India census, Chinnavedampatti had a population of 10,349. Males constitute 51% of the population and females 49%. Chinnavedampatti has an average literacy rate of 70%, higher than the national average of 59.5%; with male literacy of 79% and female literacy of 61%. 10% of the population is under 6 years of age.

Etymology
It is believed that in ancient days Chinnavedampatti was predominant by Brahmins.  The area was known for its enchantments about vedic mantras.  Hence the area was initially known as Vedampatti, which means Place of Veda. Since the number of families were very less, people added Chinna (which means small) before the name of the place.  Then it became Chinna + Vedam + Patti (Small Place of Veda) = Chinnavedampatti.

History
In earlier days Chinnavedampatti was purely an agricultural area.  With the emergence of Coimbatore into the industrial hub of South India, this place being a suburb also witnessed high rate investments in Mechanical and IT industries as well as for modern educational facilities.  Presently, Chinnavedampatti is a well-developed area in Coimbatore with respect to all these industries.  Accordingly, the living standard of the people in this town is booming into ultramodern.

Arts and culture
Chinnavedampatti is very rich with respect to Arts and Culture and famous for nourishing Tamil culture.  There are people from many communities and religions in this town.  However, almost 80% of them are Tamil People. There are several temple in this town.  Most famous temples are:
 Sree Dhandayuthapani Thirukkovil Temple
 Sree Koniamman Thirukkovil Temple

It also has a Great Madam (mutt), The Kaumara Madalayam, headed By Swami Kumaraguruparar. The Mutt is more than 100 years old. It was founded by SriLa Sri Ramananda swamigal. The third pontiff of this mutt Sri Sundra Swamigal performed an Elephant Puja by bringing 108 elephants.

Major industries
Chinnavedampatti being a suburb of Coimbatore Industrial City, have many large, medium and small scale industries established.  Thousands of people from other part of Tamil Nadu and rest of India work in these industries.  Some of the major and famous industries are:

 CRI Pumps
 Unicorn Engineers
 STPI
 Udaya Metal Industries
Indu Industries
 Lakshmi Engineering Industries
 Welboro Paints
 Beekay Steel Industries
 Sri Renuka Industries
 epes carbide tools India private limited
 Sri Kumaraguru Textiles
 Instrument India

Major attractions
 International Schools
Ksirs International School
   
 Public Schools
LT.K.S Matriculation School,
T.R.A Higher Secondary School.

 Software Technology Parks
 Chinnavedampatti Lake.

References

Suburbs of Coimbatore
Cities and towns in Coimbatore district